is a Japanese actress.

She represented Japan at Miss Universe 1978 in Acapulco, Mexico, but did not advance to the semifinals.

Selected filmography

Film
 Maison Ikkoku: Apartment Fantasy (1986)
 Florence My Love (1991)
 The Inugamis (2006)
 Ryuzo and the Seven Henchmen (2015)
 The Setting Sun (2022)

TV series
Natsu ni Koisuru Onnatachi (1983)
Asa ga Kita (2015-2016)
The Grand Family (2021)
My Ex-Boyfriend's Last Will (2022), Mariko Morikawa

References

External links
 

1958 births
Japanese actresses
Japanese beauty pageant winners
Living people
Miss Universe 1978 contestants
People from Osaka